Career suicide may refer to:
An action that ruins one's career
Career Suicide (band), a Canadian hardcore band
Career Suicide, a 2004 album by Lennon
Career Suicide (album), a 2007 album by A Wilhelm Scream
Career Suicide, an HBO show by comedian Chris Gethard